Polyardis is a genus of midges in the family Cecidomyiidae. The ten described species are found in the Holarctic and Australasian realms. The genus was first described by entomologist Arthur Earl Pritchard in 1947.

Species
Polyardis adela Pritchard, 1947
Polyardis bispinosa (Mamaev, 1963)
Polyardis crebra (Pritchard, 1947)
Polyardis illustris Jaschhof, 2004
Polyardis micromyoides Jaschhhof, 1998
Polyardis occulta Jaschhof, 1997
Polyardis recondita (Lengersdorf, 1939)
Polyardis silvalis (Rondani, 1840)
Polyardis triangula Jaschhof, 2004
Polyardis vitinea (Felt, 1907)

References

Cecidomyiidae genera

Insects described in 1947
Taxa named by Arthur Earl Pritchard